Adri Middag (born 24 January 1973) is a Dutch rower. He competed at the 1996 Summer Olympics and the 2000 Summer Olympics.

References

External links
 
 

1973 births
Living people
Dutch male rowers
Olympic rowers of the Netherlands
Rowers at the 1996 Summer Olympics
Rowers at the 2000 Summer Olympics
Sportspeople from Zwolle